Peter Dooley (born 4 August 1994) is an Irish rugby union player for Connacht. His preferred position is loosehead prop. In 2016 he was awarded a senior contract with Leinster following completion of his time in the academy, having previously played with the Leinster senior team, making his debut in October 2014 against Edinburgh He was voted the Leinster Young Player of the year in 2015.

Rugby career

Early career

Dooley started his rugby playing underage at Birr RFC in Co. Offaly. Playing number 8 in his teenage years, Dooley was part of the Leinster under-age set up. After entering the Leinster academy he was advised to switch to change position to Loosehead Prop.

Ireland
Dooley has represented Ireland at under-age level. In June 2021 he was called up to the senior Ireland squad for the Summer tests.

References

External links
Leinster Profile
Pro14 Profile

1994 births
Living people
Rugby union players from County Offaly
Irish rugby union players
Lansdowne Football Club players
Leinster Rugby players
Rugby union props
Connacht Rugby players